This is a partial list of streets in Zamboanga del Norte, Philippines.

Dapitan

Dipolog

Manukan

Polanco

Siocon

References

Zamboanga del Norte
Streets in Zamboanga del Norte
Zamboanga del Norte
Zamboanga del Norte